Field Marshal François de La Rochefoucauld, Marquis de Montandre, also known as Francis de La Rochefoucauld, (September 1672 - 11 August 1739) was a British soldier, who arrived in England as a Huguenot refugee. After serving as a junior officer during the Williamite War in Ireland, he was given command of Francis du Cambon's Regiment of Foot and led his regiment in the Low Countries during the Nine Years' War . He also fought at the Siege of Badajoz and at the Battle of Alcantara during the War of the Spanish Succession. He went on to be Master General of the Ordnance in Ireland.

Military career

Born the son of Charles-Louis de La Rochefoucauld, 2nd marquis of Montandre of the Doudeauville branch of the family and Madeline-Anne de La Rochefoucauld (née Pithou), de La Rochefoucauld was brought up in France as a Roman Catholic but converted to Protestantism. After arriving in England as a Huguenot refugee in the aftermath of the Edict of Fontainebleau of 1685, La Rochefoucauld joined William III's Army and served under the Earl of Galway during the Williamite War in Ireland. He was commissioned as a brevet lieutenant colonel and given command of Francis du Cambon's Regiment of Foot on 15 February 1692. He went with his regiment to the Low Countries in September 1692 during the Nine Years' War and in 1702 succeeded his brother Isaac, who died without issue, as 4th marquis de Montandre.

La Rochefoucauld joined the staff of the Earl of Galway as a brigadier-general in 1704 and fought at the Siege of Badajoz in October 1705 and the Battle of Alcantara in April 1706 during the War of the Spanish Succession. Promoted to major-general in the English Army on 1 June 1706, he took part in the advance to Madrid in June 1706 and became colonel of Dungannon's Regiment in November 1706. He was given command of a brigade which landed in Portugal in June 1707 and led the brigade at the Battle of Caya in May 1709. On 29 September 1709 de La Rochefoucauld returned to London to report to Queen Anne on the course of operations in Portugal. Promoted to lieutenant general on 9 May 1710, he became colonel of a new regiment on the Irish establishment in 1715 but this regiment was disbanded in 1718.

La Rochefoucauld was appointed a Privy Counsellor of Ireland and became Master General of the Ordnance in Ireland in January 1727. Promoted to full general on 18 December 1735, he became Governor of Guernsey in September 1737. He was promoted to field marshal on 2 July 1739. He died at his home in Grosvenor Square in London on 11 August 1739 and was buried in Westminster Abbey. A new stone, quarried in Montendre and brought to London at the expense of the present Duc de La Rochefoucauld-Doudeauville, was placed over his grave on 15 January 2013.

Family
In April 1710 de La Rochefoucauld married Mary Anne von Spanheim, daughter of Ezekiel, Freiherr von Spanheim (the Prussian ambassador to London); they had no children.

References

Sources

1672 births
1739 deaths
Huguenots
British field marshals
Members of the Privy Council of Ireland
Converts to Calvinism from Roman Catholicism
French emigrants to the Kingdom of England
Burials at Westminster Abbey
British Army personnel of the War of the Spanish Succession
Williamite military personnel of the Williamite War in Ireland
British military personnel of the Nine Years' War